Jung Yoon-hak is a South Korean actor, model and singer. He is the leader of Supernova. He is known for his lead roles in My Unfortunate Boyfriend, Bouncer and Ichijiku no Mori.

Personal life
On April 3, 2020, it was revealed that Jung Yoon-hak had tested positive for the coronavirus on April 1. He started to show symptoms three days after returning to South Korea from Japan. On April 3, 2020, he was quarantined and was treated at a hospital in Seoul. He recovered from the sickness and returned to his projects.

Discography

Filmography

Television

Film

Hosting

Theater

References

External links 
 
 
 

1984 births
Living people
People from Seoul
Male actors from Seoul
Models from Seoul
Singers from Seoul
21st-century South Korean male actors
MBK Entertainment artists
South Korean male models
South Korean male television actors
South Korean male film actors
South Korean male idols
South Korean male singers
South Korean male voice actors
South Korean pop singers
Aichi University alumni
Kyung Hee University alumni